Kathleen H. Liebert (born October 1, 1967 in Tennessee) is an American professional poker player.

Poker 
Liebert started her professional poker career as a prop player in Colorado.  She would later go on to enter tournaments and she won the first Party Poker Million event in 2002, the first limit poker tournament with a $1 million prize.

She has made six World Poker Tour (WPT) final tables, including a third-place finish in the 2005 Borgata Poker Open, making her the highest finishing woman on the WPT until a runner-up finish by J. J. Liu in the 2007 Bay 101 Shooting Stars tournament. Liebert went on to tie the record at the 2009 Shooting Stars tournament, placing second to Steve Brecher in  the longest final table in WPT history.  Her record was broken on March 5, 2008, when Van Nguyen became the first woman to win a televised WPT mixed event at the WPT Invitational in Commerce, California.

At the 2004 World Series of Poker, Liebert won a gold bracelet in a $1,500 Limit Texas hold 'em Shootout event. Along with (Cyndy Violette and Annie Duke she was one of three women to win an open event in that year's WSOP. Liebert also appeared on and won the series 2005 Poker Royale: Battle of the Sexes. After being eliminated from the World Speed Poker Open in London in September 2005, Kathy provided commentary on the final table alongside Gary Jones. On June 1, 2008, Liebert made the final table of the $10,000 Pot-Limit Hold'em World Championship at the 2008 World Series of Poker and finished in 3rd place, earning $306,064.

As of 2022, she has one World Series of Poker (WSOP) bracelet and her total live tournament winnings exceed $6,650,000.

Already a member of the Women in Poker Hall of Fame, in 2022 Liebert was nominated for the Poker Hall of Fame.

Liebert now resides in Las Vegas, Nevada and Downey, California.

References

External links
 Official site

1967 births
American poker players
Living people
Poker commentators
World Series of Poker bracelet winners
Female poker players
Marist College alumni
People from Downey, California